The Capitol–Main Historic District encompasses a well-preserved area of early 19th-century commercial architecture in downtown Little Rock, Arkansas.  The district includes 2-1/2 blocks of Capitol Street, extending east from Center Street, one block of Main Street south of Capitol, and one block of 6th Street west of Main.  The buildings in this area were mostly built before World War II, and are of a more modest scale than modern sections of the downtown.  Notable buildings include the LaFayette Hotel and the Pfeifer Brothers Department Store.

The district was listed on the National Register of Historic Places in 2012.

See also

National Register of Historic Places listings in Little Rock, Arkansas

References

Colonial Revival architecture in Arkansas
Historic districts in Little Rock, Arkansas
Historic districts on the National Register of Historic Places in Arkansas
National Register of Historic Places in Little Rock, Arkansas